The 2009 Asian Canoe Sprint Championships was the 13th Asian Canoe Sprint Championships and took place from September 26–29, 2009 in Azadi Lake, Tehran, Iran.

Medal summary

Men

Women

Medal table

References

Official website
Results

Canoe Sprint Championships
Asian Canoe Sprint Championships
Asian Canoeing Championships
International sports competitions hosted by Iran